Naptha is an unincorporated community located in Brunswick County, in the U.S. state of Virginia.

It has also been called Crossroads, Va.

The Abernathy family were one of the 5 families that founded Brunswick county.

in the early 1920s Robert Abernathy built a country store at the intersection of Poor House and Liberty roads across from the Crossroads School.

The store closed in the late 1980s.  The old school (now a storage barn) was destroyed by fire in the 1990s.

References

Unincorporated communities in Virginia
Unincorporated communities in Brunswick County, Virginia